
Gmina Dubeninki is a rural gmina (administrative district) in Gołdap County, Warmian-Masurian Voivodeship, in northern Poland, on the border with Russia.

The gmina contains part of the protected area called Puszcza Romincka Landscape Park.

Villages
Gmina Dubeninki contains the villages and settlements of Barcie, Będziszewo, Białe Jeziorki, Błąkały, Błędziszki, Bludzie Małe, Bludzie Wielkie, Boczki, Budwiecie, Cisówek, Czarne, Degucie, Dubeninki, Golubie, Golubie Male, Kiekskiejmy, Kiepojcie, Kociołki, Kramnik, Lenkupie, Linowo, Łoje, Łysogóra, Maciejowięta, Markowo, Marlinowo, Meszno, Orliniec, Ostrowo, Pluszkiejmy, Pobłędzie, Przerośl Gołdapska, Przesławki, Rakówek, Redyki, Rogajny, Skajzgiry, Stańczyki, Sumowo, Tuniszki, Wobały, Wysoki Garb, Żabojady, Zawiszyn, Żerdziny and Żytkiejmy.

Neighbouring gminas
Gmina Dubeninki is bordered by the gminas of Filipów, Gołdap, Przerośl and Wiżajny. It also borders Russia (Kaliningrad oblast).

References
Polish official population figures 2006

Dubeninki
Gołdap County